The Indiana High School Football Conference was an Indiana High School Athletic Association (IHSAA)-sanctioned conference founded in 1926 by 10 members. The founding members were:
Elwood
Evansville Central
Fort Wayne South
Gary Emerson
Indianapolis Tech
Mishawaka
Muncie
Richmond Morton
South Bend Central
Terre Haute Gerstmeyer

7 teams withdrew  Fort Wayne South (1926); Terre Haute Gerstmeyer (1926); Mishawaka (1927); Richmond (1927); Gary Emerson (1928); South Bend Central (1928); New Castle (1930).

Added (12): Linton-Stockton (1926); Marion (1926); Clinton (1928); Logansport (1928); Bicknell (1929); Kokomo (1929); Bloomington (1930); Brazil (1930); New Castle (1930); Wabash (1930); Sullivan (1931); Vincennes Lincoln (1931).

The conference ended in 1931 and the final members were (15): 
Bicknell
Bloomington
Brazil
Clinton
Elwood
Evansville Central
Indianapolis Tech
Kokomo
Linton-Stockton
Logansport
Marion
Muncie Central
Sullivan
Vincennes Lincoln
Wabash.

Champions
1926 Gary Emerson (3-0) & Mishawaka (3-0)
1927 Linton-Stockton (4-1) & Muncie (4-1-1)
1928 Clinton (4-0)
1929 Clinton
1930 Logansport (4-0)
1931 Clinton (3-0) & Marion (5-0)

Resources 
 IHSAA Conferences
 IHSAA Directory

References

Indiana high school athletic conferences
High school sports conferences and leagues in the United States